De Wolf is a Dutch surname meaning 'of the wolf'. It may be descriptive or toponymic of origin. Variations include De Wolfe, De Wulf, Dewulf and van der Wolf. People with these surnames include:

People with the surname
De Wolf
Cees de Wolf (1945–2011), Dutch footballer
 (1880–1935), Dutch organist and composer
Dirk De Wolf (born 1961), Belgian road race cyclist
Fons De Wolf (born 1956), Belgian road race cyclist
Henri De Wolf (born 1936), Belgian road race cyclist
Jacob de Wolf (1630–1685), Dutch painter
James De Wolf (1764–1837), American privateer, slaver and US Senator from Rhode Island 
John de Wolf (born 1962), Dutch footballer
John Anthony St. Etienne de Wolf (1931–2003), Canadian journalist, economist and politician
 (1952–2011), Belgian composer, conductor and musician
Michel De Wolf (born 1958), Belgian footballer
Nico de Wolf (1887–1967), Dutch footballer
Piet de Wolf (1921–2013), Dutch footballer
Richard Crosby De Wolf (1875–1947), American copyright law scholar
Steve De Wolf (born 1975), Belgian road race cyclist

DeWolf
Benjamin DeWolf (1744–1819), Nova Scotian politician and businessman
Benjamin DeWolf (died after 1836), Nova Scotian merchant and politician
Elisha DeWolf (1756–1837), Nova Scotian judge and politician
Elisha DeWolf Jr. (1801–1850), Nova Scotian politician
Harry DeWolf (1903–2000), Canadian Vice Admiral
James De Wolf (1764–1837), United States Senator from Rhode Island 
James Madison DeWolf (1843–1876), American military officer
James Ratchford DeWolf (1787–1855), Nova Scotian businessman and politician 
Jamie DeWolf (born 1979), American slam poet and spoken word comedian
Loran DeWolf (1754 – after 1818), Nova Scotian politician
Nick DeWolf (1928–2006), co-founder of Teradyne
Ronald DeWolf (1934–1991), L. Ron Hubbard's son
Thomas Andrew Strange DeWolf (1795–1878), Nova Scotian businessman and politician
Wallace Leroy DeWolf (1854–1930), American businessman and artist

De Wolfe
Billy De Wolfe (1907–1974), American character actor
Elsie de Wolfe (1859–1950), American actress and interior decorator
Margaret De Wolfe (1881–1956), English stage and film actress
Meyer de Wolfe (1887–1964), Dutch-born composer and conductor, founder of De Wolfe Music 
Roland De Wolfe (born 1979), English poker player

DeWolfe
Barbara DeWolfe (1912–2008), American ornithologist 
Chris DeWolfe (born 1966), American entrepreneur
James P. deWolfe (1896–1966), American Episcopal bishop

De Wolff
Arjen de Wolff (born 1969), Dutch politician and human rights activist
Bernard de Wolff (born 1955), Dutch painter
Charles de Wolff (1932–2011), Dutch organist and conductor
Charles Esmond de Wolff (1893–1986), British Army officer
Francis de Wolff (1913–1984), English character actor
Leon de Wolff (1948–2014), Dutch journalist, media consultant and academic
Riem de Wolff (born 1943), Indo-Dutch pop musician, brother of Ruud
Ruud de Wolff (1941–2000), Indo-Dutch  pop musician, brother of Riem
Salomon de Wolff (1878–1960), Dutch economist and politician

De Wulf
Frank De Wulf (born 1968), Belgian DJ
Jimmy De Wulf (born 1980), Belgian footballer
Maurice De Wulf (born 1980), Belgian philosopher

Dewulf
Bernard Dewulf (1960–2021), Belgian poet and journalist
Filip Dewulf (born 1972), Belgian tennis player 
Jeroen Dewulf (born 1972), Belgian scholar
Noureen Dewulf (born 1984), American actress

Fictional characters
Jean DeWolff, police detective in the Spider-Man comic books

As a given or middle name
Julia de Wolf Gibbs (1866–1952), American author and craftsman
DeWolf Hopper (1858–1935), American actor, singer, comedian, and theatrical producer
M. A. De Wolfe Howe (1864–1960), American editor and author.
Mark Antony De Wolfe Howe (1808–1895), American Episcopal bishop
Alice De Wolf Kellogg (1862–1900),  American painter 
James De Wolf Perry (1871–1947) was an American Episcopal clergyman and prelate
Leonard Percy de Wolfe Tilley (1870–1947), Canadian lawyer and Premier of New Brunswick
Henry DeWolf Smyth (1898–1986), American physicist, diplomat, and bureaucrat

Andy DeWolfe farmer of small hay bales

See also
DeWolf (disambiguation)
DeWolf family
Dewolfe
De Wolfe
De Wolfe Music - British production music company, originator of library music.
Wolf (name)
Wolfe (surname)

Wulf,  common Germanic name element

References

Dutch-language surnames